Nowosiółki Przednie  is a settlement in the administrative district of Gmina Lubycza Królewska, within Tomaszów Lubelski County, Lublin Voivodeship, in eastern Poland, close to the border with Ukraine.

References

Villages in Tomaszów Lubelski County